Oler or Olers is a surname. Notable people with the surname include:

Kim Oler, American television and theatrical composer
Wesley Oler (1891–1980), baseball player and track and field athlete
Jessica Olérs (born 1978), former Miss Sweden
David Oler (1902–1985), artist